Ernest Albert Atherton (22 March 1879 – 29 June 1954) was a farmer and member of the Queensland Legislative Assembly.

Early days
Atherton was the youngest son of John Atherton (pioneer) and his wife Catherine (née Grainger). The family had settled on the extensive Emerald End cattle station and their station homestead was attacked many times by bands of indigenous people. He was educated at Cairns State School and also received private tuition in Port Douglas. When he finished his education he spent time as a butcher and storekeeper before becoming a sugar cane and dairy farmer.

Political career
After being the first chairman of the Barron Shire Council, at the 1929 state election, Atherton contested the seat of Chillagoe for the Country and Progressive National Party and defeated Labor sitting member, John O'Keefe. He was immediately elevated to the ministry as the Secretary for Mines in the Moore Ministry but by the 1932 state election Chillagoe had been abolished. He stood for the new seat of The Tableland, but was defeated by Labor candidate Harry Bruce.

Personal life
On 10 April 1912, Atherton married Honoria Christiana Svendsen (died 1975) and together had two sons and one daughter. Honoria went on to be President of Queensland CWA and earned herself an OBE.

Atherton died in June 1954 and was buried in the Atherton family cemetery at Emerald End.

References

Members of the Queensland Legislative Assembly
1879 births
1954 deaths